Aravali Road railway station is a station on Konkan Railway. It is at a distance of  down from origin. The preceding station on the line is Sawarda railway station and the next station is Sangameshwar railway station.

The station offers free Wi-Fi.

References

Railway stations along Konkan Railway line
Railway stations in Ratnagiri district
Ratnagiri railway division